Raliawas (रालियावास) is a village in Rewari district of Haryana, India. The village is located on the bank of the Sahibi river, and it is a Yadav Dominant village . The village has various facilities, such as a post office, government primary and high schools, a government dispensary, veterinary hospital, telephone exchange, and cooperative bank.

Demographics
As of 2011 India census, Raliawas had a population of 2470 in 475 households. Males (1309) constitute 52.99%  of the population and females (1161) 47%. Raliawas has an average literacy(1783) rate of 72.18%, lower than the national average of 74%: male literacy(1075) is 60.29%, and female literacy(708) is 39.7% of total literates (1783). In Raliawas, 11.86% of the population is under 6 years of age (293).

Adjacent villages
Masani
Rasgan
Dungarwas
Hansaka
Jaunawas (jonawas) 
Nikhri
Kanhawas
Salhawas
Ashiaki
Majra Gurdas

References 

Villages in Rewari district